"Tie Me Down" is a song by American DJ and producer Gryffin and American singer Elley Duhé, released on August 3, 2018, from his debut studio album Gravity (2018).

Background

Gryffin said in a statement: "Tie Me Down' is a song that's been over a year in the making." "It's one of the hardest records I've had to make, but one of my favorites. We went through over 10 different vocalists looking for the perfect match on this song, and finally found it with Elley Duhé. She brings the perfect energy and passion to the record, and I couldn't be more proud of the way it came together."

Music video
The music video was released on September 5, 2018, directed by Drew Kirsch and Jordan Rosenheck. They use real people to express their love, and it has a universal message of acceptance and love.

Live performance
On December 23, 2018, Gryffin and Duhé Performed "Tie Me Down" on Jimmy Kimmel Live!

Charts

Weekly charts

Year-end charts

Certifications

References

2018 singles
2018 songs
Gryffin songs
Elley Duhé songs
Geffen Records singles
Songs written by Aron Forbes
Songs written by Gryffin
Songs written by Jussifer
Songs written by Sarah Aarons